The 2000 Northeast Conference baseball tournament began on May 12 and ended on May 14, 2000, at The Sandcastle in Atlantic City, New Jersey.  The league's top four teams competed in the double elimination tournament.  Fourth-seeded  won their first tournament championship and earned the Northeast Conference's automatic bid to the 2000 NCAA Division I baseball tournament.

Seeding and format
The two division winners claimed the top two seeds, with the next two teams by conference winning percentage rounding out the field.  They played a double-elimination tournament.

Bracket

Most Valuable Player
Steve Coppola of Wagner was named Tournament Most Valuable Player.  Rival threw a complete game two-hit shutout in the Seahawks 5–0 win over Monmouth in the winner's bracket matchup.

References

Tournament
Northeast Conference Baseball Tournament
Northeast Conference baseball tournament
Northeast Conference baseball tournament